Eric Andrew Finkelstein is an American health economist. He is a Professor in the Health Services & Systems Research Program at Duke-NUS Medical School, where he is also the executive director of the Lien Centre for Palliative Care. He is also a research professor at Duke University's Global Health Institute.

Education
Finkelstein received his B.A. from the University of Michigan in 1991 and his M.A., Ph.D., and M.H.A. from the University of Washington in 1996, 1998, and 1999, respectively.

Academic career
In 1999, Finkelstein joined RTI International as a senior health economist, and became the director of the Public Health Economics Program there in 2006. He served as an associate professor at Duke-NUS from 2009 until he was appointed a full professor there in 2013.

Research

Finkelstein is known for his studies examining the economic costs of obesity. One study led by Finkelstein estimated that 42% of Americans would have obesity by 2030.

Books
Finkelstein is the author of two books: "Incidence and Economic Burden of Injuries in the United States" (2006) and "The Fattening of America" (2008).

References

External links
Eric Finkelstein at Google Scholar

21st-century American economists
Health economists
1970 births
Living people
Duke University faculty
University of Michigan alumni
University of Washington alumni